Daniel Davidson (born in 1983) is a Canadian country singer and songwriter. He is best known as the guitarist and later lead vocalist of rock group Tupelo Honey. Since 2014, Davidson has been pursuing a solo career in country music. His second solo single, "Found", reached 16 on the Canada Country chart, making it the highest-charting independent single on Canadian country radio.

Career
In 2003, Davidson joined five fellow musicians from Grant MacEwan College to form the rock band Tupelo Honey. He released three extended plays with the band between 2006 and 2008 as the guitarist and backing vocalist. When their lead singer parted ways with the band in 2010, Davidson took over that role.

In addition to his work with Tupelo Honey, Davidson also served as a songwriter and producer for other Canadian artists during this period, as part of his partnership with Red Brick Songs. Following the release of Brave New World in 2014, the band has been on hiatus and Davidson redirected his efforts towards a solo musical career in country music. He is currently unsigned and independently released his first solo single, "Unkiss Her", in July 2015. Davidson has worked with Jeff Dalziel, Karen Kosowski, Troy Samson, Alee, Emma-Lee, and Pete Lesperance on his forthcoming debut record.

His second single, "Found", was released in March 2016. It became his first song to chart on the Billboard Canada Country chart, where it reached a peak of 16. This made it the highest-charting independent single by a Canadian country artist.

Discography

Extended plays

Singles

Music videos

Awards and nominations

References

External links

Living people
Canadian country guitarists
Canadian male guitarists
Canadian country singer-songwriters
Canadian male singer-songwriters
Musicians from Edmonton
1983 births
21st-century Canadian guitarists
21st-century Canadian male singers